The November 6, 2007 special Election, was an off-year election in which no members of the Congress, statewide offices, or members of the Oregon Legislative Assembly were scheduled for election. However, two statewide measures were referred by the legislature to the 2007 November Special Election ballot. While there were only two issues on the ballot, they touched on important enough 
issues that they attracted one hundred seventy-five arguments in total, both in favor of, and against them in the voter's pamphlet.

October 16 was the last day someone could have registered to vote in this election if this was their first time voting in Oregon. Because of a new centralized voter registration database, a voter previously registered could still move within the state, and could change their address until Election Day at 8 pm and still vote.

Ballot measures

Measure 49 

Modifies Measure 37; clarifies right to build homes; limits large developments; protects farms, forests, groundwater.

Measure 50 

Amends Constitution: Dedicates funds to provide health care for children, fund tobacco prevention, through increased tobacco tax..

See also 
 Seventy-fourth Oregon Legislative Assembly
 Elections in Oregon

Notes

External links 
 Voters' Pamphlet from the Oregon Secretary of State

 
Oregon
Oregon elections by year